are a character duo originally designed in 2004 for Sanrio by   Kazumi Fukasawa (深沢和美). The duo are composed of twin bunnies called Shirousa and Kurousa (both born on May 26), who specialize in making sweets and pastries. After the success of the franchise, Sanrio created more bunny twins who each specialize in their own jobs. They all live in the magical world of Bunniesfield.

The characters gained a Japanese anime series in 2007. The series is directed by Hiroshi Kugimiya, the key animator of Death Note, and is a produced by Asahi Production. The original series premiered on TV Tokyo and Kids Station as a segment of the program Kitty Paradise Plus on April 3, 2007, and ended later that year after 27 episodes.

Story
One day, 14 bunnies were transported from their home world of Bunniesfield to the human world in order to complete a task assigned to them by the Two Queens. As they arrive, they meet and befriend Sophia, a human girl who dreams of being the best pastry chef in all of Europe. Although Sophia keeps the bunnies hidden from everyone in town, even her parents, their cover is blown when the whole town finds out they are real. Together, they make delicious foods with the Sugarbunnies each making their own special treats.

Characters in the franchise

Bunniesfield denizens
Both in the franchise and anime:

Shirousa is Kurousa's twin brother and along with Kurousa, is a pâtissier specializing in making pastries (cakes, cookies, etc.). Always seen with his twin brother, both bunnies love to make sweets. He and Kurousa befriended Sophia when he and his friends were transported to the human world. Everyone except Sophia thought they were dolls, and they were kept hidden until revealed (mostly by accident). They assist Sophia with teaching her how to bake because she doesn't know how.

Kurousa is Shirousa's twin brother and, along with Shirousa, is a pâtissier specializing in making pastries (cakes, cookies, etc.). Always seen with his twin brother, both bunnies loves to make sweets. He and Shirousa befriended Sophia when he and his friends were transported to the human world. They assist her in helping her to bake because she doesn't know how.

Hanausa and her twin Momousa are florists, specializing in planting and taking care of flowers. She befriends Sophia as well as her friends, but she seems to live with one of Sophia's friends, along with the other three girls once they are found out. The two also have the ability to sniff out certain kinds of flowers.

Momousa and her twin Hanausa are florists, specializing in planting and taking care of flowers. She befriends Sophia as well as her friends, but she seems to live with one of Sophia's friends, along with the other three girls once they are found out. She has a crush on Kurousa. The two also have the ability to sniff out certain kinds of flowers.

Buchiusa and his twin Mintousa specialize in making ice cream (Called "gelato" in the anime). He befriends Sophia as well as his friends, but seems to live with one of Sophia's friends, along with three other bunnies once they are found out. He is white with black spots like a Dalmatian.

Mintousa and his twin Buchiusa specialize in making ice cream (called "gelato" in the anime). She befriends Sophia as well as his friends, but seems to live with one of Sophia's friends, along with three other bunnies once they are found out.

Aomimiusa and his twin brother Aousa specialize in making hard candy and drinking glasses. He befriends Sophia as well as his friends, but seems to live with one of Sophia's friends, along with three other bunnies once they are found out.

Aousa and his twin Aomimiusa specialize in making hard candy and drinking glasses. He befriends Sophia as well as his friends, but seems to live with one of Sophia's friends, along with three other bunnies once they are found out.

Sututoberiusa and her twin Buruberiusa specialize in making different kinds of jam. She befriends Sophia as well, but seem to live with one of Sophia's friends, along with the other three girls once they are found out.

Buruberiusa and her twin Suturoberiusa specialize in making different kinds of jam. She befriends Sophia as well, but seem to live with one of Sophia's friends, along with the other three girls once they are found out.

Rateusa and his twin Kapuchiinousa specialize in making coffee. He befriends Sophia as well, but seems to live with one of Sophia's friends, along with three other bunnies once they are found out. Rateusa is also able to throw his ears in the air, but he only seems to do this when in serious danger.

Kapuchiinousa and his twin Rateusa specialize in making coffee. He befriends Sophia as well, but seems to live with one of Sophia's friends, along with three other bunnies once they are found out. Like his brother, he has the ability to throw his ears up in the air, which the other bunnies cannot seem to do.

Komugiusa and his twin Pandausa specialize in making bread. He befriends Sophia as well, but seems to live with one of Sophia's friends, along with three other bunnies once they are found out. He often dozes off.

Pandausa and his twin Komugiusa specialize in making bread. He befriends Sophia as well, but seems to live with one of Sophia's friends, along with three other bunnies once they are found out.

Others that only appear in the franchise:

Balletusa is the elder twin sister of Primausa. She wears a silver tiara that matches with her pink fur. She is a graceful and elegant ballet dancer who loves make-up and accessories. Balletusa and Primausa together make up the duo Sugarminuet.

Primausa is the sweet and cute younger twin sister of Balletusa. She wears a gold tiara that highlights her white fur. Her favorite hobby is fortune-telling.  Primausa and Balletusa together make up the duo  Sugarminuet.

Cocoa is a green mouse and the older brother of Vanilla. He wears a brown bunny hat. He and his sister live in Mousefields, located next of Bunniesfield. Both brother and sister decided to visit Bunniesfield one day through a rainbow and met Shirousa and Kurousa. The mouse siblings so liked the sweets, chocolates and pastries the bunnies make they wanted the bunnies to teach them to become chocolatiers. The bunnies agreed and made the mouse siblings their apprentices. Their ultimate goal is to make a castle made of chocolate.

Vanilla is a pink mouse and the younger sister of Cocoa. She wears a white bunny hat. She and her brother live in Mousefields, located next of Bunniesfield. Both brother and sister decided to visit Bunniesfield one day through a rainbow and met Shirousa and Kurousa. The mouse siblings so liked the sweets, chocolates and pastries the bunnies make they wanted the bunnies to teach them to become chocolatiers. The bunnies agreed and made the mouse siblings their apprentices. Their ultimate goal is to make a castle made of chocolate.

Characters introduced the Anime

The main protagonist of the Anime series. Sophia is a human girl living in France who dreams on becoming the best pâtissier when she grows up. She first met both Shirousa and Kurousa and befriended them, both teaching her how to bake. Later on, she finds and befriends the other Sugarbunnies. She lives on a house just above their family bookshop.

Sophia's mother and the wife of Bernard, who works as an illustrator for various storybooks. She's also one of the people who knew of the existence of the Sugarbunnies after they found out they were real. Her real name is Rosary Cherbourg.

Sophia's father and the owner of the family bookshop, he's one of the people who knew of the existence of the Sugarbunnies after they found out they were real. His real name is Bernard Cherbourg.

One of Sophia's close friends, she's born from a prestigious rich family and also has a dream on becoming the best pastry chief just like Sophia. She's also one of the people who knew of the existence of the Sugarbunnies after they found out they were real.

Pierre is also one of Sophia's close friends and an expert biker, who sometimes goes on tours all across Europe. He's also one of the people who knew the existence of the Sugarbunnies after they found out they were real.

She's also one of Sophia's close friends and also one of the people who knew of the existence of the Sugarbunnies after they found out they were real.

A friend of Sophia. He is a large boy who likes sweets. When he first sees the Sugarbunnies move, he isn't completely convinced they're alive, but eventually finds out they are real.

Charlotte is a young girl who dreams to be the best ballerina and perform along with her parents, but she has problems with her dancing. In Sugarbunnies: Chocolat!, she found out about the Sugarbunnies and befriended them while teaching them how to dance gracefully.

Setting
The anime takes place in Europe, mostly in some provinces in France, on which pastry chiefs and baking were part of their tradition. It's also hinted in the second episode of Sugarbunnies: Chocolat! that Paris is also seen.

Sequels
Two sequel series were produced to coincide with the series. The sequel series, titled  premiered on April 1, 2008, and once again ended with 27 episodes on September 23. On February 16, 2009, a third season was announced by Sanrio titled , which started airing on April 7, 2009, and ended on September 29, 2009.

A manga adaptation by Kanaki Shiori titled  is published by Shogakukan, serialized in the Ladybug Comics Special label.

DVD releases
All three series gained a major DVD-box release in Japan by Pony Canyon, featuring all the episodes of all three arcs and both opening and ending songs never used in the anime itself.

References

External links
 Official Anime Website 
 Official Website 
 Sugarminuet Official Website 
 

Asahi Production
Fictional characters introduced in 2004
Animated television series about rabbits and hares
Sanrio characters
Shogakukan manga
Twins in fiction
Child characters in anime and manga